Roman Chatrnúch (born February 12, 1973) is a Slovak former professional ice hockey defenceman.

Chatrnúch played a total of 22 games in the Czech Extraliga, playing for HC Slavia Praha and HC Kladno. He also played in the Tipsport Liga for MHK Dubnica, HK 36 Skalica and HK Dukla Trenčín.

After his initial retirement in 2013, Chatrnúch was briefly an assistant coach for Dukla Trenčín. He then came out of retirement with MHK Dubnica in the Slovak 2. Liga during the 2016–17 season and became an assistant coach for the team during the 2019–20 season.

References

External links

1973 births
Living people
HC Berounští Medvědi players
Piráti Chomutov players
HK Dubnica players
HK Dukla Trenčín players
Rytíři Kladno players
BK Mladá Boleslav players
ŠHK 37 Piešťany players
HK 91 Senica players
HK 36 Skalica players
HC Slavia Praha players
Slovak ice hockey coaches
Slovak ice hockey defencemen
Hokej Šumperk 2003 players
HC Vrchlabí players
Slovak expatriate ice hockey players in the Czech Republic